Oriole Park was the home of the Auburn Baseball Club in New South Wales, Australia. It hosted the Claxton Shield in 1970, 1975, 1980, and 1981. The field was extended and had lighting added prior to hosting the 1980 competition. Oriole Park also held the 1988 U-18 Baseball World Cup.

Oriole Park was last used in 2014. In 2017 the Cumberland Council announced that Oriole Park would be torn down as restoring it would be too expensive.

References

Sports venues in Sydney
Baseball venues in Australia
History of baseball in Australia
Sports venues completed in the 1960s
Sports venues demolished in 2017
1960s establishments in Australia
2017 disestablishments in Australia

ko:무라빈 오벌